Spetsopoula is an island situated to the southeast of Spetses, which is one of the Saronic Islands, in the region of Attica and the Aegean Sea. Its area is about 2 Km2. According to 2011 census the island is uninhabited but the previous census (2001) reported a population of 8 inhabitants.

Historical information
The ancient name of the island was Aristera and is referred by Greek traveler and geographer Pausanias. The modern name means small Spetses and owes it in the nearby Spetses. In 1962 the island was purchased by Greek shipping magnate Stavros Niarchos. Spetsopoula is linked with the death of Eugenia Livanos, former wife of Stavros Niarchos. She was found dead on the island on 4 May 1970.  The island is still owned by descendants of Stavros Niarchos. Spetsopoula is often visited by people of high society, friends of Niarchos family.

Historical population

References

External links 
 Map of Spetsopoula, Wiki Mapia
 All about Spetses and history 

Saronic Islands
Private islands of Greece
Niarchos family
Islands of Attica
Landforms of Islands (regional unit)